Bremer Bay is a coastal town situated on the south coast of Western Australia in the Great Southern region between Albany and Esperance, at the mouth of the Bremer River.

Demographics
In 2016 the townsite had a population of 231.  Over the 2018 Christmas and New Year holiday period the town's population reached almost 6,500.

History

The area was originally settled in the 1850s with the first homestead, the Wellstead homestead being built in 1857 and the first telegraph station being built in 1875. A second telegraph station was built of stone in 1896 to replace the first one.

The town was originally included in the township of Wellstead until a local petition in 1951 favoured a change to the current name, which was approved and gazetted in 1962.

In 2012, the town was menaced by a bushfire that burnt for five days after being started by lightning. The fire burnt out  of farmland and bushland, requiring 120 fire-fighters to bring it under control just outside the town.

Amenities
Bremer Bay is known for its beautiful beaches; the main beach is only 10 minutes walk from town. A marina at Fishery Beach offers full boating facilities. The Bremer Marine Park lies offshore. Electricity is generated by a wind-diesel hybrid system.

References

External links
Bremer Bay Community Resource Centre

Great Southern (Western Australia)
Coastal towns in Western Australia
Bays of Western Australia
South coast of Western Australia